Malaysia Bible Seminary (MBS) is an interdenominational evangelical seminary located in the town of Kuang, Gombak District, Selangor, Malaysia to train local Christians preparing for ministry. The seminary was established in 1978, originally located at Luther House, Petaling Jaya, Selangor.

The Chinese Department was established with the transfer of 5 students from the Malaysia Christian Training Centre, Rawang, which then closed. The English Department was established in the same year with the merging of the Pusat Latihan Kristian Melaka (Malacca Christian Training Centre, established in 1976) into the seminary. Both of the predecessor centres were founded with the help of OMF International.

The founding Principal was Rev. Dr. Lukas Tjandra from Indonesia. Due to immigration restrictions, he left Malaysia in 1986, and was succeeded by the second Principal, Rev. Dr. Lee Ken Ang in 1989. The third Principal, Rev. Dr. Tan Kim Sai, was appointed in 1997, and was succeeded by the fourth Principal Dr. Jason Lim  January, 2010 to December, 2014. Rev. Dr. Lee Mee Onn serves as the fifth and present Principal w.e.f. January, 2015.

Key Personnel 

 Council Chairman:
 Prof. Dr. Tan Chong Tin

 Council Vice-Chairman:
 Pr. Dr. Daniel Ho

English Department 

 Dean:
 Rev. Dr. Tony Lim

 Associate Dean:
 Alison Lee

 Associate Dean of Students:
 Elder Jack Mock

Chinese Department 

 Dean:
 Dr Lee Mee Onn

 Associate Dean:
 Rev. Dr. Francis Lai

 Dean of Students:
 Dr. Leow Hong Too

 Director of Development:
 Rev. Dr. Stanley Lai

Center for Christianity and Malaysian Studies(CCMS) 
 Director of CCMS:
 Dr. Tan Hann Tzuu

Programs 

MBS offers academic programs leading to the awarding of the following qualifications:

Undergraduate 

 Certificate in Theology / Ministry (1 Year)
 Diploma in Theology / Ministry (1 Year)
 Bachelor of Ministry (4 Years)
 Bachelor of Theology (4 Years)

Graduate 

 Graduate Diploma in Christian Studies (1 Year)
 Master of Christian Studies (2 Years)
 Master of Ministry (3-4 Years, Modular)
 Master of Divinity (3 Years)

Accreditation 

The following programs offered by MBS are accredited by the ATA:

 Diploma in Theology
 Bachelor of Ministry
 Bachelor of Theology
 Graduate Diploma in Christian Studies
 Master of Christian Studies
 Master of Ministry
 Master of Divinity

References

External links 
 MBS Website

Seminaries and theological colleges in Malaysia
Protestantism in Malaysia
Educational institutions established in 1978
1978 establishments in Malaysia